The 20th Annual American Music Awards were held on January 25, 1993, at the Shrine Auditorium, in Los Angeles, California. The awards recognized the most popular artists and albums from the year 1992. It was hosted by Bobby Brown, Gloria Estefan and Wynonna Judd. 

Mariah Carey was the most nominated artist of the night, with a total of 6; and the singer, Michael Jackson and Michael Bolton were the big winners of the night, scoring two awards each. Michael Jackson was also awarded with the International Artist Award, and since he was the first artist awarded with the honor, Eddie Murphy announced that it would be called as the Michael Jackson International Artist Award.

Performances

Winners and nominees

References
 http://www.rockonthenet.com/archive/1993/amas.htm

1993